David Harney (2 March 1947 – April 2019) was an English professional footballer who played in the Football League for Grimsby Town, Scunthorpe United and Brentford as a forward.

Career 
A forward, Harney began his career with Grimsby Town and moved to Third Division club Scunthorpe United in July 1967. Injuries plagued his career at the Old Showground and he joined Fourth Division club Brentford on trial in October 1969, but was not offered a contract and made just one appearance. Harney finished his career in non-League football with Wimbledon and Bromley.

Career statistics

References

1947 births
Sportspeople from Jarrow
Footballers from Tyne and Wear
English footballers
Association football forwards
Grimsby Town F.C. players
Scunthorpe United F.C. players
Brentford F.C. players
Wimbledon F.C. players
English Football League players
Southern Football League players
2019 deaths
Bromley F.C. players